Jahić is a Bosnian patronymic surname formed by adding the Slavic diminutive suffix -ić to the Bosnian rendition Jahja of the common male Muslim name Yahya, the Arabic version of the name John (thus roughly corresponding to the English surnames Johnson, Jones etc.) and may refer to:

 Danial Jahić (1979-2021), Serbian long jumper
 Fahreta Jahić (born 1960), Yugoslav and Serbian singer
 Muamer Jahić (born 1979), Bosnian footballer
 Safet Jahič (born 1987), Slovenian footballer
 Sanel Jahić (born 1981), Bosnian footballer
 Senad Jahić (born 1987), Slovenian footballer

References

Bosnian surnames
Patronymic surnames